Erwin Linder (1903–1968) was a German stage, film and television actor.

Selected filmography
 Only One Night (1950)
 Klettermaxe (1952)
 Dreaming Lips (1953)
 Wedding in Transit (1953)
 Don't Forget Love (1953)
 The Marriage of Doctor Danwitz (1956)
 The Zurich Engagement (1957)
 The Man Who Couldn't Say No (1958)
 The Blue Moth (1959)
 The Rest Is Silence (1959)
 The Man Who Sold Himself (1959)
 Darkness Fell on Gotenhafen (1960)
 The Woman by the Dark Window (1960)
 I Learned That in Paris (1960)
  (1962, TV miniseries)
 Liselotte of the Palatinate (1966)

References

Bibliography
 Herbert Meyer. Das Nationaltheater Mannheim: 1929-1979. Bibliographisches Institut, 1979.

External links

1903 births
1968 deaths
German male film actors
German male television actors
German male stage actors
People from Weinheim